Vasile Vasilache (January 20, 1926 in Paşcani – March 13, 1977 in Chişinău) was a literary critic from Moldova.

He graduated from Moldova State University in 1951 and got his PhD in 1956. He was one of the most influential literary critic in Moldovan SSR.

Works
 Opere alese (1955),
 Izbrannoe (1959).
 Studies on Constantin Stere, Andrei Lupan, Emilian Bukov, George Meniuc.
 Istoria literaturii moldoveneşti (Vol.1, 1958),
 Schiţă asupra istoriei literaturii sovietice moldoveneşti(1963),
 Din trecutul cultural şi literar al poporului moldovenesc(1969)

References

Bibliography 
 Literatura şi arta Moldovei Encicl. - Vol. 1 - Chişinău, 1985
 Chisinau-enciclopedie, 1997

External links 
 Vasilenco Ion - critic şi istoric literar
 Ion Vasilenco
 Ion Vasilenco
 Un băgător de seamă la timona datoriei
 Vladimir Beşleagă, Conştiinţa naţională sub regimul comunist totalitar (VII) - (R.S.S.M. 1956-1963)

1926 births
1977 deaths
People from Pașcani
Eastern Orthodox Christians from Romania
Moldovan writers
Moldovan male writers
Romanian writers
Moldova State University alumni